John Chiang (born July 31, 1962) is an American politician who served as the 33rd Treasurer of California from 2015 to 2019. A member of the Democratic Party, he previously served as the 31st Controller of California from 2007 to 2015 and on the California State Board of Equalization from 1997 to 2007.

On May 17, 2016, Chiang announced his campaign for Governor of California in the 2018 election. He did not qualify for the general election, placing fifth in the non-partisan primary.

Early life and education
Chiang was born to Taiwanese parents who immigrated to the United States. Chiang's father, Chiang Mu-dong (江牧東), a Pingtung County native of Hakka descent from Neipu, relocated to the United States in 1950 to pursue graduate studies at Cleveland State University, after graduating with a degree in chemical engineering from National Taiwan University. Chiang's mother, Shen Yin-hsiang (沈吟香), was a Tainan native, who studied abroad in Japan before immigrating to the United States to pursue further studies. Chiang's parents met at the University of Notre Dame, and soon married.

Chiang was born in New York City and grew up in the Chicago suburbs. He attended Carl Sandburg High School where he served as student body vice-president alongside student body president Dave Jones. Lifelong friends, Chiang and Jones would run again together in 2010 on the California Democratic slate, with Chiang winning reelection as State Controller and Jones being elected Insurance Commissioner, and again in 2014, with Chiang being elected State Treasurer and Jones winning reelection as Insurance Commissioner.  Both would go down in defeat in the 2018 primary, with Chiang coming in fifth place for Governor of California and Jones coming in third place for Attorney General of California.

Chiang graduated with honors with a degree in finance from the University of South Florida and has a J.D. degree from Georgetown University Law Center. His decision to pursue law was influenced by his maternal grandfather, Shen Rong (沈榮), who was a prominent lawyer in Taiwan.

Early career 
In 1987, Chiang moved to Los Angeles, where he got involved with the Democratic Party of the San Fernando Valley and the West LA Democratic Club.

Chiang began his career as a tax law specialist for the IRS. He worked as an attorney for then-California State Controller Gray Davis, and also worked on the staff of California Senator Barbara Boxer.

In 1997, Chiang was appointed to the California Board of Equalization after incumbent Brad Sherman resigned, having been elected to the U.S. House of Representatives. In 1998, Chiang was elected to the office; he was re-elected to a second four-year term in 2002-2006. He was Chair for three years and represented the Fourth District, primarily serving southern Los Angeles County.

California State Controller (2007–2015)
Chiang ran for California State Controller in 2006. He won the Democratic primary with 53% of the vote, defeating State Senator Joe Dunn. In the general election, he defeated Republican State Assemblyman Tony Strickland by over 870,000 votes. Chiang took office on January 8, 2007.

Chiang ran for a second term in 2010. He was unopposed in the Democratic primary. In the general election, he had a rematch with Strickland, who had been elected to the State Senate in the intervening period. Chiang defeated Strickland again, by more than 1.8 million votes.

Health benefits for retired state employees 
In May 2007, Chiang released a report that found that the state of California "would have to pay an additional $2.2 billion annually" over 30 years in order to pay for health benefits for all currently retired state employees and current state employees who will be retiring. Chiang's actions were praised as having "gotten a needed discussion reignited".

Seizing unclaimed property 
In June 2007, a U.S. District Judge banned the State Controller's office from seizing unclaimed property because the State was not giving "fair notice to the owner and public". Because a ban could cause the State to lose $300 million per year in revenue, Chiang took steps to improve the notification of people whose assets were about to be seized, including sending them notices, and to improve the ability of people to recover their assets once seized. In October 2007, the U.S. District Judge found that Chiang's measures "satisfie[d] constitutional due process" and lifted his ban.

State worker salaries 
In July 2008, former Governor of California Schwarzenegger was reported to be planning to "slash the pay of more than 200,000 state workers to the federal minimum of $6.55 per hour," among other measures, due to a lack of an approved state budget. Chiang defied the order, characterizing Schwarzenegger's idea as "a poorly devised strategy to put pressure on the Legislature to enact a budget" and stated that he would continue to pay state workers their full salaries. He issued IOUs for everything from contractors’ payments to tax refunds. Chiang claimed that he had "both constitutional and statutory authority" to continue payments and that Schwarzenegger was trying to make Chiang "do something that's improper and illegal".  He received support from the Democratic leadership in the state Senate and Assembly. When Schwarzenegger issued a formal executive order, Chiang sent a formal letter to Schwarzenegger "reiterating his position". At a rally of state workers in Los Angeles, Chiang called them "innocent victims of a political struggle".

Bureau of State Audits review 
In a report issued in May 2014, California's Bureau of State Audits (BSA) concluded that ""The number and magnitude of errors we found indicate the Controller’s Office lacks a sufficient review process to prevent and detect significant errors." A Sacramento news station added up the mistakes, calculating that BSA had reported $31.65 billion in errors. The controller’s office concurred with the BSA assessment, saying that the problems were due to high staff turnover, challenges in recruiting qualified staff, budget cuts, inadequate funding, and late, erroneous data from numerous state agencies.

California State Treasurer (2015–2019)
Chiang was elected California State Treasurer in 2014, defeating Republican businessman Greg Conlon by more than 1.2 million votes, 58.8% to 41.2%. He was sworn into office on January 4, 2015, succeeding term-limited Democratic incumbent Bill Lockyer. Chiang did not run for reelection in 2018.

Wells Fargo 
Chiang imposed a 12-month ban from investment work on Wells Fargo in September 2016, barring the bank from underwriting California's state debt for a year. This was in response to the federal report announcing that Wells Fargo employees had opened up to 2 million unauthorized accounts in an attempt to raise Wells Fargo profits. However, just 8 months later, Wells Fargo won a competitive bid to sell $636 million of general obligations in California. This is due to a state law that requires Chiang to accept only the lowest bid at an auction. A spokesman for Chiang said they "were pleased with the price," and "it does not reflect our feelings about their behavior toward their customers."

2018 gubernatorial bid

On May 17, 2016, Chiang announced his intentions to run for Governor of California in 2018. In polls conducted in January and February 2018 he only garnered 11% support. He was eliminated in the jungle primary when he placed 5th with only 655,920 votes (9.4%).

Personal life
Chiang has two younger brothers, Roger and Bob, and one sister, Joyce, who was murdered in 1999. Chiang is a Roman Catholic and cites his faith for his opposition to the death penalty. In 2016, he and his wife separated after a decade of marriage. They had no children together.

Electoral history

References

External links

Official State of California biography
San Francisco Chronicle debate (webcast) for California State Controller
Lecture by John Chiang at University of California, Berkeley video

|-

|-

1962 births
21st-century American politicians
American politicians of Taiwanese descent
California politicians of Chinese descent
Catholics from California
California Democrats
Candidates in the 2018 United States elections
Catholics from Illinois
Georgetown University Law Center alumni
Living people
Members of Committee of 100
People from Palos Heights, Illinois
Politicians from Chicago
State Controllers of California
State treasurers of California
University of South Florida alumni
People from Torrance, California
Politicians from Los Angeles